OPW may refer to:

 Obóz Polski Walczącej (Camp of Fighting Poland)
 Office of Public Works
 One Pro Wrestling
 Opuwo Airport (IATA: OPW)
 OPW is a subsidiary of Dover Corporation
 Osaka Pro Wrestling
 Our Perfect Wedding, a South African wedding television show
 GNOME Outreach Program for Women, later renamed to Outreachy

See also
 Organisation for the Prohibition of Chemical Weapons (OPCW)